The 1936 Tipperary Senior Hurling Championship was the 46th staging of the Tipperary Senior Hurling Championship since its establishment by the Tipperary County Board in 1887.

Thurles Sarsfields were the defending champions.

Thurles Sarsfields won the championship after a 2-01 to 0-03 defeat of Roscrea in the final. It was their 10th championship title overall and their second title in succession.

References

Tipperary
Tipperary Senior Hurling Championship